Magyar Bank is a bank based in New Brunswick, New Jersey with branches in Central Jersey.

The bank was founded in 1922 as the Magyar Building and Loan Association by a group of Hungarian immigrants and businessmen in New Brunswick, many of whom had settled in the city's Fifth Ward. ("Magyar" is the Hungarian-language word for Hungarian peoples and language). In 1954, its charter was amended and the  name changed to Magyar Savings & Loan Association. In 1989 it became  Magyar Savings Bank, SLA and in 2005 Magyar Bank.

In January 2006 Magyar Bancorp, parent company of Magyar Bank, began trading on the NASDAQ stock market under the symbol MGYR.  The MagyarBank Charitable Foundation, 501(c) organization, was established in June 2006.

See also
Thomas Lankey

References 

Banks based in New Jersey
Companies based in New Brunswick, New Jersey
Companies listed on the Nasdaq